Adrian Parker (born 2 March 1951) is a British modern pentathlete and Olympic champion.

He won a team gold medal in the modern pentathlon at the 1976 Summer Olympics in Montreal, with Danny Nightingale and Jim Fox. He finished 5th in individual modern pentathlon at the 1976 Olympics. Parker won the final event, the cross-country, with an "outstanding run", which helped Britain to win the gold medal. Parker had been the British pentathlon champion in 1975.

References

External links
Olympic profile

1951 births
Living people
British male modern pentathletes
Olympic modern pentathletes of Great Britain
Modern pentathletes at the 1976 Summer Olympics
English Olympic medallists
Olympic gold medallists for Great Britain
Olympic medalists in modern pentathlon
Athletes from London
Medalists at the 1976 Summer Olympics